The 6888th Central Postal Directory Battalion, nicknamed the "Six Triple Eight", was an all-black battalion of the Women's Army Corps (WAC). The 6888th had 855 black women, both enlisted and officers, and was led by Major Charity Adams. It was the only all-black, all-female battalion sent overseas during World War II. The group motto was "No mail, low morale".

The battalion was organized into five companies, Headquarters, Company A, Company B, Company C, and Company D. Most of the 6888th worked as postal clerks, but others were cooks, mechanics and held other support positions, so that the 6888th was a self-sufficient unit.

History 

During World War II, there was a significant shortage of soldiers who were able to manage the postal service for the U.S. Army overseas. In 1944, Mary McLeod Bethune worked to get the support of the First Lady, Eleanor Roosevelt, for "a role for black women in the war overseas." Black newspapers, too, challenged the U.S. Army to "use black women in meaningful Army jobs."

The women who signed up went to basic training in Georgia. Women who were already in the WAC, like Alyce Dixon, served at different locations, including the Pentagon, before they joined the 6888th.

Great Britain 
The Île de France encountered several German U-boats on the trip, forcing the ship to take evasive maneuvers. The ship reached Glasgow, Scotland, on February 14 safely, though a German V-1 flying bomb exploded near the dock. The battalion was transported by train to Birmingham. On 15 February the unit was inspected and marched in review before Lt. Gen. John C. H. Lee, Commanding General, Communications Zone, European Theater of Operations (ETO), and Maj Gen. Robert McGowan Littlejohn, Chief Quartermaster, ETO, whose responsibilities included the mail.

When the 6888th settled in at Birmingham, "they saw letters stacked to the ceiling of the temporary post office" in unheated converted hangars. Some letters had been in the makeshift offices for as long as two years. Army officials believed that undelivered mail was "hurting morale." Many letters and packages had only the first name of the intended recipient, had a commonly used name or used nicknames. There was estimated to be a backlog of 17 million items.

Early in the operation, a white general attempted to send a white officer to "tell them how to do it right," but Major Adams responded, "Sir, over my dead body, sir!" The battalion finished what was supposed to be a six-month task in three months in May 1945.

The 6888th devised their own system to handle the backlog of mail. This included creating and maintaining a card index of names of those with the same or similar names, using military serial numbers to distinguish between them. This finally contained 7 million cards. The women of the 6888th worked in three different shifts, seven days a week, processing and delivering mail – a morale booster – to fighting troops in Europe. Each shift handled an estimated 65,000 pieces of mail. In total, the unit handled mail for over four million military and civilians, as well as clearing backlogs in the UK and France.

The 6888th was a segregated unit, sleeping and eating in different locations from the white, male soldiers. They were housed in a former school building, with officers quartered in houses nearby. Some of the women felt that the European locals treated them better than people did in the United States. However, there was also evidence of sexist and racist treatment by male soldiers. Cold weather when they arrived meant the women had to wear coats and extra clothes when working in the unheated post office buildings. 

A chaplain working at Birmingham caused problems for Adams, ordering her soldiers not to report to work, but to report to his office, causing them to be AWOL. Adams had to "'counsel' him to let the women alone, "reminding him that she was in charge of the women's assignments".

France 
Once the backlog in Birmingham had been dealt with, the 6888th was shipped across the Channel to Le Havre in May 1945 and then was transported by train to Rouen to deal with another backlog of mail there, with some of the letters being three years old. The military police in the WAC unit were not allowed to have weapons, so they used jujitsu to keep out "unwanted visitors". They also participated in a parade ceremony at the place where Joan of Arc was executed.

By October 1945, the mail in Rouen had been cleared and the 6888th was sent to Paris. They marched through the city and were housed in a luxurious hotel, where they received first-class treatment. During this time, because the war was over, the battalion was reduced by 300 women, with a further 200 to be discharged in January 1946.

Post-war 
In February 1946, the unit returned to the United States where it was disbanded at Fort Dix, New Jersey. There was no public recognition for their service at the time.

Legacy 
Members of the 6888th Central Postal Directory Battalion were awarded the European African Middle Eastern Campaign Medal, the Good Conduct Medal, and the World War II Victory Medal during their service.

On February 25, 2009, the battalion was honored at the Women in Military Service for America Memorial at Arlington National Cemetery. The event was attended by three former unit members of the 6888th including Alyce Dixon, Mary Ragland, and Gladys Shuster Carter. Dixon and Ragland were also honored by President Barack Obama and first lady Michelle Obama in 2009.

On March 15, 2016, the 6888th Central Postal Directory Battalion was inducted into the U.S. Army Women's Foundation Hall of Fame. Battalion veteran Elsie Garris attended the Induction Ceremony.

On November 30, 2018, Fort Leavenworth dedicated a monument to the women of the 6888th Central Postal Directory Battalion. Five women from the battalion -  Maybeel Campbell, Elizabeth Johnson, Lena King, Anna Robertson, and Deloris Ruddock - were present at the dedication.

On February 12, 2021, U.S. Senators Jerry Moran (R-Kan.) and Jacky Rosen (D-Nevada) introduced bipartisan legislation to award the Congressional Gold Medal to the members of the Women’s Army Corps, who were assigned to the 6888th Central Postal Directory Battalion during World War II. U.S. Representative Gwen Moore (D-Wis.) introduced the companion legislation in the House. Introduced during the 116th Congress (S.321 & HB1012), it unanimously passed the Senate but did not advance through the House (referred to the Committee on Financial Services, and to the Committee on House Administration). On March 14, 2022, President Biden signed a bipartisan bill to award the battalion the Congressional Gold Medal.

As of 2022, there are only six remaining members left: Romay Davis, Cresencia Garcia, Fannie McClendon, Gladys E. Blount, Lena King, and Anna Mae Robertson.

The battalion has been the subject of several film and theatre projects. In 2019, the documentary The SixTripleEight: No Mail, Low Morale directed by historian James Theres was released.  Theres suggested to Colonel Edna Cummings, who helped lead an effort for the monument to the Six Triple Eight in Fort Leavenworth, that the women should be awarded the Congressional Gold Medal. In 2022, the story of the 6888th Central Postal Directory Battalion inspired the development of a new musical, with the working title of "6888: The Musical", with Blair Underwood as executive producer. Tyler Perry wrote, directed, and produced an upcoming Netflix film, Six Triple Eight, based on the 6888 Postal Directory Battalion, starring Kerry Washington as Charity Adams.

References

Further reading

External links
World War II – Major Charity Adams – 6888 Postal Battalion (video)

African-American history of the United States military
All-female military units and formations
Military units and formations established in 1945
Military units and formations disestablished in 1946
African-American women's organizations
Battalions of the United States Army in World War II
Articles containing video clips
Women's Army Corps soldiers
20th-century African-American women
20th-century African-American people
Postal history of the United States
Sustainment and support units and formations of the United States Army
Military mail
Women's Army Corps